Angus Charles Graham, FBA (8 July 1919 – 26 March 1991) was a Welsh scholar and sinologist who was professor of classical Chinese at the School of Oriental and African Studies, University of London.

He was born in Penarth, Glamorgan, Wales to Charles Harold and Mabelle Graham, the elder of two children. His father was originally a coal merchant who moved to Malaya to start a rubber plantation, and died in 1928 of malaria. Graham attended Ellesmore College, Shropshire, 1932–1937, and went on to read Theology at Corpus Christi College, Oxford (graduating in 1940), and Chinese at the School of Oriental and African Studies (SOAS), University of London (graduating in 1949). In 1950 he was appointed Lecturer in Classical Chinese at SOAS, promoted to Professor in 1971, and to Professor Emeritus after his retirement in 1984. He lived in Borehamwood.

He also held visiting positions at Hong Kong University, Yale, the University of Michigan, the Society of Humanities at Cornell, the Institute of East Asian Philosophies in Singapore, National Tsing Hua University in Taiwan, Brown University, and the University of Hawaii. He was elected a Fellow of the British Academy in 1981.

Publications
Later Mohist Logic (reprint - Hong Kong: Chinese University Press, 2003)
Chuang-tzu: The Inner Chapters (reprint - Indianapolis: Hackett Publishing, 2001)
The Book of Lieh-tzu (reprint - New York: Columbia University Press, 1990)
Disputers of the Tao: philosophical argument in ancient China (La Salle, Illinois: Open Court, 1989) [trans. into Chinese by Zhang Haiyan "Lun dao zhe: Zhongguo gudai zhexue lun bian", Beijing: Zhongguo shehui kexue chubanshe, 2003)
Poems of the West Lake, translations from the Chinese (London: Wellsweep, 1990)
Chuang-tzu: The Inner Chapters and other Writings from the Book of Chuang-tzu (London: Unwin Paperbacks, 1986)
Divisions in early Mohism reflected in the core chapters of Mo-tzu (Singapore: Institute of East Asian Philosophies, 1985)
Chuang-tzu: textual notes to a partial translation (London: SOAS, 1982)
Later Mohist Logic, Ethics and Science (Hong Kong and London, 1978)
Poems of the Late T'ang (Baltimore, Penguin Books, 1965)
The Book of Lieh-tzu, a new translation (London: John Murray, 1960)
The Nung-Chia ‘School of the Tillers’ and the Origin of the Peasant Utopianism in China // Bulletin of the School of Oriental and African Studies, University of London, Vol.42 no.1, 1978, pp. 66–100. Reprinted in Graham A.C. Studies in Early Chinese Philosophy and Philosophical Literature. SUNY Press, 1986.

References

External links
Translated Penguin Book - at  Penguin First Editions reference site of early first edition Penguin Books.

Academics of SOAS University of London
Alumni of Corpus Christi College, Oxford
Fellows of the British Academy
British sinologists
1919 births
1991 deaths
People from Penarth
Alumni of SOAS University of London
20th-century British historians
University of Michigan staff